The Russian 7th Army was a World War I Russian field army that fought on the Eastern theatre of war.

Field management was established in July 1914 at the headquarters of the Odessa Military District. 
The initial task of the Army was to guard the Black Sea coast and the border with Romania. 

In October 1914 it was moved west and became part of the Southwestern Front.
The 7th Army participated in the Brusilov Offensive in 1916, and Kerensky Offensive in 1917.
It was disbanded in early 1918.

Commanders
 07.19.1914 – 10.19.1915 — General of Artillery Vladimir Nikolayevich Nikitin
 19.10.1915 – 11.04.1917 — General of Infantry Dmitry Shcherbachev
 13.04.1917 – 20.06.1917 — Lieutenant-General Leonid Bielkowicz
 26.06.1917 – 09.09.1917 — Lieutenant-General Vladimir Selivachyov
 09.09.1917 – 03.12.1917 — Lieutenant-General Januariusz Cichowicz

See also
 List of Russian armies in World War I
 List of Imperial Russian Army formations and units

References

Armies of the Russian Empire
Military units and formations established in 1914
1914 establishments in the Russian Empire
Military units and formations disestablished in 1917